Meycauayan, officially the City of Meycauayan, is a 1st class component city in the province of Bulacan, Philippines. According to the 2020 census, it has a population of 225,673 people. It is one of the oldest towns in the province.

It is bounded by the town of Marilao to the north, the two Metro Manila cities of Valenzuela to the south and Caloocan (North) to the east, and the town of Obando to the west.

Etymology
Meycauayan got its name came from the words "may kawayan", translated to English as "has bamboo". It is formerly called as Mecabayan.

History
During the Spanish colonization of the country, the town of Meycauayan was established as a settlement by a group of Spanish priests belonging to the Franciscan Order. In 1578, its early inhabitants came into contact with Christianity. In that same year, Father Juan de Placencia and Diego Oropesa built the first church structure, which was believed to be made of nipa and bamboo. Common to all Spanish settlements in that period was the adoption of a patron saint for the newly opened town. Meycauayan has St. Francis of Assisi as the Patron Saint. It was only in 1668, however, that a concrete church structure was erected.

Meycauayan was then one of the largest towns in the province of Bulacan. The towns, which fell under its political jurisdiction, were San Jose del Monte, Bocaue, Valenzuela (formerly Polo), Obando, Marilao, Santa Maria and Pandi. It was also regarded as the unofficial capital of the province, being the hub of activities brought about by the establishment of the market center and the presence of the Spanish military detachment. During the revolution, which was set off by the execution of Dr. Jose Rizal in 1896, Meycauayan contributed its share in the fight against the Spanish conquistadores. Among her sons who figured prominently in the revolution were: Andres Pacheco, Ciriaco Contreras, Guillermo Contreras, Guillermo Bonque, and Liberato Exaltacion. There were many others who had joined the revolution and had displayed their exceptional heroism until 1898, when the country gained its independence from Spain.

In 1949, a big fire razed the market center and several business establishments in the town, causing setbacks to the development of the municipality. It took several years to recover from the destruction and property losses. However, in the 1960s and early part of 1970s, new hope for the development was ushered in. Reconstruction and rehabilitation of infrastructure facilities were made possible through the assistance of the provincial and national governments. A more sound economic base was established and crop production more than doubled.

Cityhood

On March 5, 2001, Former President Gloria Macapagal Arroyo signed Republic Act 9021 converting the municipality of Meycauayan into a component city. The plebiscite was held on March 30, 2001, along with the then-municipality of Cauayan in Isabela. However, the cityhood bid was rejected by voters and Meycauayan remains a municipality. Only the "Yes" votes won in the separate plebiscite for cityhood in Cauayan.

Five years later, on October 2, 2006, Arroyo signed Republic Act 9356, filed by Congresswoman Reylina Nicolas on July 24 of this year as House Bill 4397, converting Meycauayan into a city once again for the second time. Meycauayan was successfully became a city (third city in Bulacan) on December 10, 2006, after their voters ratified the law in the plebiscite.

Contemporary
Today, the city of Meycauayan has transformed into a major economic and industrial hub in the Province of Bulacan and the rest of Region III.

Geography
The City of Meycauayan is generally surrounded with plain land and gentle rolling hills. Meycauayan is named to Filipino phrase may kawayan that means "with bamboo". Comfortably above sea level, this terrain is an interweaving of greenery and concrete road network. The slope of the land dips towards a west to north westerly direction. River, natural lake and drainage waterways envelope and criss-cross the area.

Today it is bordered by the town of Marilao to the north, towns of Bocaue and Bulakan, Bulacan to the northwest, Valenzuela to the south, Northern part of Caloocan to the east, and the town of Obando to the west.

Barangays
Meycauayan is administratively subdivided into 26 urban barangays.

Climate

Demographics

Government
The Sangguniang Panlungsod is the legislature of the government of Meycauayan. As defined by the Local Government Code of 1991, the legislatures have legislative and quasi-judicial powers and functions. The members of the Sangguniang Panlungsod, often referred to as councilors are either elected or ex-officio and includes a city's vice mayor who serves as the presiding officer.

Past officials

Economy

The City of Meycauayan is the economic, industrial, commercial, financial and educational center of southern Bulacan. The city is known for its jewelry and leather industries. For years, Meycauayan has been the hub of jewelry production in the Philippines and in Asia. It is known for its low-priced jewelries. The locality also produces leather goods. Shoes, bags and every kind of leather product has been traditionally manufactured here. A number of leather tanneries still operate in Meycauayan, which over the years have converted the city into a hub for leather goods.

In 2016, the total net income for Meycauayan is worth Php 6.875 billion, making it the richest in the province of Bulacan and 18th-highest-income city in the Philippines.

Industrial compounds and parks
The City of Meycauayan is also home to many industrial parks and compounds.

Meycauayan Industrial Subd. I, II, III & IV
Meridian Industrial Compound
Muralla Industrial Park
First Valenzuela Industrial Compound
Sterling Industrial Park Phase I, II, III & IV

Education

Meycauayan City have its own division of schools since January 2013. The City Schools Division of Meycauayan has two districts, Meycauayan West District and Meycauayan East District.

There are 24 public elementary schools and 4 public high schools as well as 11 private schools in the city. There are also tertiary schools in Meycauayan. Polytechnic College of the City of Meycauayan is under the funding and management of the City Government, currently located at Pag-asa Street, Barangay Malhacan. Meycauayan College is a private educational institution in Barangay Calvario and Malhacan. It was established in 1925 as Meycauayan Institute. Other than tertiary education, it also offers primary and secondary education.

Religion

Saint Francis of Assisi Parish Church, commonly known as the Meycauayan Church, is a Roman Catholic church located in Meycauayan, Philippines. It is one of the oldest parishes in Bulacan which even predates the Malolos Cathedral established in 1580 and the Barasoain Church established in 1859. It is also the province's largest parish with an estimated population of about 80,000 parishioners. The church is the seat of the vicariate of St. Francis of Assisi in the Diocese of Malolos.

Feasts

Liputan Barrio Fiesta

This festival takes place every 2nd Sunday of May in Barangay Liputan. After a nine-day novena, the fiesta culminates with a colorful fluvial procession in honor of the "Mahal na Señor", an image of the Crucified Christ venerated on the island of Liputan. The image, along with those of the Virgin and St. Joseph, are placed on a pagoda, a makeshift bamboo bier constructed on boats and decorated with buntings. The images are then taken to the old church in the town center of Meycauayan for a mass.

Feast of St. Francis of Assisi

It is a celebration held in the oldest church in Meycauayan, the St. Francis of Assisi Parish Church in Barangay Poblacion, which commemorates the foundation of the city in 1578 by the Franciscans. Before, it has come to be known as the "Kawayanan Festival", and includes an animal parade, street dancing, and other related cultural activities. It is held every fourth of October.

Issues and controversies

Mayoralty dispute (1995–2008)
The succession of the city's administration was put into question by a series of legal cases between two then-Mayors. Florentino Blanco, town mayor from 1987 to 1992, ran in 1995 but was disqualified by the Supreme Court for vote buying on July 21, 1997. Blanco was replaced by Vice Mayor Eduardo Nolasco in an acting capacity, serving out the remainder of his term.

Blanco ran again in 1998 but lost to Eduardo Alarilla; Blanco attempted to file an election protest against Alarilla but the COMELEC dismissed the case. He attempted to run again in 2004 but later withdrew his candidacy. In 2007, he ran once more but lost to Eduardo Alarilla's wife, Joan Alarilla (Mr. Alarilla has then reached the three-term limit imposed by law). The then Mayor Alarilla then attempted to disqualify Blanco; the COMELEC ruled in favor of Alarilla, but the Supreme Court reversed this decision, stating that Blanco is still eligible to run for public office.

Heirs of Anacleto Nieto vs. Meycauayan, Bulacan
On December 13, 2007, the Supreme Court of the Philippines ordered Meycauayan, Bulacan to surrender peaceful possession to the Heirs of Anacleto Nieto, and vacate the 3,882 square meters lot, at Poblacion, Meycauayan, TCT No. T-24.055 (M) which it used and even constructed an extension of the public market therein. Meycauayan was also ordered to pay the reasonable value of the property and P 1,716,000.00 as reasonable compensation for the use of the property from 1966 until the filing of the complaint on December 28, 1994.

Pollution
In 2007, The Meycauayan and the neighboring town of Marilao in Bulacan province shared a slot in the list of the world's 30 most polluted places in the developing world drawn up by the private New York-based institute Pure Earth. In its report, "The World’s Worst Polluted Places" for 2007, Pure Earth said: "Industrial waste is haphazardly dumped into the Meycauayan, Marilao and Obando River system, a source of drinking and agricultural water supplies for the 250,000 people living in and around" the Meycauayan-Marilao area. Meycauayan also shares border with Caloocan.

Gallery

References

External links

 Meycauayan Bulacan
 Charter of the City of Meycauayan (RA 9356)
 [ Philippine Standard Geographic Code]
 Philippine Census Information

 
Cities in Bulacan
Populated places established in 1578
1578 establishments in the Philippines
Contaminated farmland
Component cities in the Philippines